Mambo Sinuendo is a studio album released by Cuban performer Manuel Galbán and producer Ry Cooder. The album was the first number-one album in the Billboard Top Latin Albums chart for Galbán and the second for Cooder (after  Buena Vista Social Club in 1998), and won the Grammy Award for Best Pop Instrumental Album at the 46th Grammy Awards.

Album history 
About the recording of this album, Cooder notes that "Galbán and I felt that there was a sound that had not been explored in a Cuban electric-guitar band that could re-interpret the atmosphere of the 1950s with beauty, agility, and simplicity. We decided on two electrics, two drum sets, congas and bass: a sexteto that could swing like a big band and penetrate the mysteries of the classic tunes. This music is powerful, lyrical, and funny; what more could you ask? Mambo Sinuendo is Cuban soul and high-performance."

Track listing 
This information from Billboard.com.
 "Drume Negrita" (Ernesto Grenet) — 5:00
 "Monte Adentro" (Arsenio Rodríguez) — 2:53
 "Los Twangueros" (Manuel Galbán, Ry Cooder) — 4:42
 "Patricia" (Perez Prado) — 3:29
 "Caballo Viejo" (Simón Díaz) — 3:51
 "Mambo Sinuendo" (Manuel Galbán, Ry Cooder, Joachim Cooder) — 2:31
 "Bodas de Oro" (Electo Rosell "Chepin") — 4:40
 "Échale Salsita" (Ignacio Piñeiro) — 4:27
 "La Luna en Tu Mirada" (Luis Chanivecky) — 4:13
 "Secret Love" (Paul Francis Webster, Sammy Fain) — 5:49
 "Bolero Sonámbulo" (Manuel Galbán, Ry Cooder) — 4:31
 "María la O" (Ernesto Lecuona) — 4:19

Personnel 
This information from Allmusic.

 Manuel Galbán — Guitar
 Ry Cooder — Organ, guitar, electric bass, steel guitar, piano, producer, vibraphone, tres
 Orlando "Cachaito" López — Bass
 Jim Keltner — Drums
 Joachim Cooder — drums
 Miguel "Angá" Díaz — Conga
 Yaure Muniz — Trumpet
 Herb Alpert — Trumpet
 Carla Commagere — vocals
 Juliette Commagere — Vocals
 Demetrio Muniz — Musical Director
 Jerry Boys — Engineer, mastering, mixing
 Nick Gold — Executive in Charge of Music
 Jimmy Hoyson — Assistant engineer
 Simon Burwell — Assistant engineer
 Isel Martinez Rodriguez — Assistant engineer
 Tom Leader — Mastering
 Sara Daoud — Production coordination
 Zita M. "Toti" Morriña — Production coordination
 Rail Jon Rogut — Digital editing
 Doyle Partners — Design

Charts

Weekly charts

Year-end charts

References 

2003 albums
Grammy Award for Best Contemporary Instrumental Album
Latin music albums by American artists
Collaborative albums
Manuel Galbán albums
Nonesuch Records albums
Ry Cooder albums